The men's sanshou 85 kilograms competition at the 2008 Beijing Wushu Tournament was held from 21 to 24 August at the Olympic Sports Center Gymnasium.

Schedule 
All times are Beijing Time (UTC+08:00)

Results 
Legend:

DI = Default-injury

KO = Knock-out

References 

Men's_sanshou_85_kg